The Dunedin College of Education (Te Kura Akau Taitoka, also known as Dunedin Teachers' College) was a former teacher training college in Dunedin, New Zealand. Founded in 1876, the college was the oldest teacher training college in New Zealand. In 2004, it merged with the University of Otago's Faculty of Education to form the University of Otago College of Education. The Dunedin College of Education's motto was maxima debetur pueris reverentia (the child deserves the greatest respect).

History
The Dunedin College of Education's roots can be traced back to the Dunedin Training College, which was established in 1876 to provide training for primary school teachers. The Presbyterian scholar, educator, historian, and social worker Dr John Hislop is regarded as the "godfather" of the Dunedin Training College. The first rector of the Training College was W.S. Fitzgerald. Over the next decades, the Dunedin Training College continued supplying teachers to primary schools. During the First World War, it functioned as a secondary school to meet the shortfall in the new students' knowledge base.

During the Great Depression, the Dunedin Training College was closed down in January 1933 due to austerity measures. The college remained closed until 1936 when it was reopened by the newly elected First Labour Government, which adopted Keynesian social security policies. During the post-World War II baby boom, the Dunedin Training College supplied both primary and secondary teachers to meet the growing population demand. In 1953, the Dunedin Training College was renamed the Dunedin Teachers' College to reflect a nationwide naming trend for similar teacher training facilities throughout New Zealand.

During the post-war period, the college expanded its teacher education programmes to include undergraduate and postgraduate degrees and graduate diplomas in early childhood, primary and primary bilingual and secondary teacher education. In 1980, the college established a satellite campus in Invercargill. In addition, teacher support services were established at its Dunedin and its Invercargill campus. In 1976, the college cooperated with the University of Otago's Faculty of Education to provide a four-year joint Bachelor of Education degree. In 1989, the college was renamed the Dunedin College of Education.

In 2002, the Dunedin College of Education and University of Otago entered into merger talks to address the duplication of courses and programs. In August 2006, the Tertiary Education Minister Michael Cullen formally approved the merger of the two educational institutions, which came into effect in January 2007. Following the merger, the newly created University of Otago College of Education acquired the Dunedin College's former campuses and the Robertson Library, which is shared with Otago Polytechnic. The former Dunedin College's archives are stored at the Hocken Collections.

Notes and references

Works cited

Further reading
Morton J. C. and Morton, H. (1976) Dunedin Teachers College: The First Hundred Years. Dunedin: Dunedin Teachers College Publications Committee.

1876 establishments in New Zealand
2007 disestablishments in New Zealand
Colleges of education in New Zealand
Defunct universities and colleges in New Zealand
Education in Dunedin
Educational institutions established in 1876
Educational institutions disestablished in 2007